Miéna is a small town and commune in the Cercle of Koutiala in the Sikasso Region of southern Mali. The commune covers an area of 190 square kilometers and includes 4 settlements. In the 2009 census it had a population of 14,365. The town of Miéna, the administrative centre (chef-lieu) of the commune, is 63 km northwest of Koutiala.

References

External links
.

Communes of Sikasso Region